Marc Russell Benioff (born September 25, 1964) is an American internet entrepreneur and philanthropist. Benioff is best known as the co-founder, chairman and CEO of the software company Salesforce, as well as being the owner of the magazine Time since 2018.

Early life and education 
Benioff was raised in a Jewish family in the San Francisco Bay Area. He graduated from Burlingame High School in 1982. Benioff received a Bachelor of Science in business administration from the University of Southern California, where he was a member of the Tau Kappa Epsilon fraternity, in 1986.

Benioff is a second cousin of showrunner and television writer David Benioff, known for Game of Thrones. He is married to Lynne Benioff and has two children. The family lives in San Francisco, California.

Career 
While in high school, Benioff sold his first application, How to Juggle, for $75. In 1979, when he was 15, Benioff founded Liberty Software, creating and selling games such as Flapper and King Arthur's Heir for the Atari 8-bit. Royalties from these games helped Benioff pay for college.

While at USC, Benioff had an internship as a programmer at Apple. He joined Oracle Corporation in a customer-service role after graduating. Benioff worked at Oracle for 13 years in a variety of sales, marketing, and product development roles. At 23, he was named Oracle's Rookie of the Year. Three years later, he became the youngest person in the company's history to earn the title of vice president.

Benioff founded Salesforce in 1999 in a San Francisco apartment and defined its mission in a marketing statement as "The End of Software." This was a slogan he used frequently to preach about software on the Web, and used as a guerilla marketing tactic against the dominant CD-ROM CRM competitor Siebel at the time. Benioff extended Salesforce's offerings in the early 2000s with the idea of a platform that allowed developers to create applications.

Benioff also serves on the World Economic Forum's Board of Trustees and USC Board of Trustees.

On September 16, 2018, Marc and his wife Lynne bought Time for $190 million.

In 2019, Benioff started Time Ventures, a venture capital fund that has invested in multiple companies, including Commonwealth Fusion Systems, Universal Hydrogen and NCX. In 2021, two companies Time Venture backed, Planet Labs and IonQ, went public.

Benioff is a member of Business Roundtable, an advocacy group of CEOs, and the Business Council.

In November 2021, Benioff became co-CEO of Salesforce when Bret Taylor's promotion to co-CEO was announced. One year later, Bret Taylor stepped down as Salesforce co-CEO, leaving Marc Benioff as the sole CEO again.

As of February 2022, Benioff had an estimated net worth of US$8.31 billion according to Bloomberg Billionaires Index.

Co-written work 
Benioff has co-written four books about business and technology. In 2004, he co-wrote Compassionate Capitalism: How Corporations Can Make Doing Good an Integral Part of Doing Well with Karen Southwick. In 2006, he co-wrote The Business of Changing the World: 20 Great Leaders on Strategic Corporate Philanthropy with Carlye Adler. In 2009, he co-wrote Behind the Cloud: The Untold Story of How Salesforce.com Went from Idea to Billion-Dollar Company and Revolutionized an Industry, also with Carlye Adler. In 2019, he again co-wrote Trailblazer: The Power of Business as the Greatest Platform for Change, with Monica Langley.[19] The book became a New York Times bestseller.

Recognition 
In 2003, President Bush appointed Benioff co-chair of the President's Information Technology Advisory Committee.

In 2009, Benioff was named a Young Global Leader by the World Economic Forum, and is a member of its Board of Trustees. 

In 2012, he was named one of the "Best CEOs in the World" by Barrons and received The Economists Innovation Award.

In 2014, Fortune readers voted him "Businessperson of the Year."

In 2016, Fortune magazine named him one of the "World's 50 Greatest Leaders."

In 2019, he was recognized as one of the 10 Best-Performing CEOs by Harvard Business Review and as the CNN Business CEO of 2020.

Philanthropy 

In addition to founding Salesforce in 1999, Benioff also founded the Salesforce Foundation. The foundation uses a "1-1-1" approach to corporate philanthropy, where the company gives one percent of employee time as volunteer hours, one percent of its product and one percent of its revenue to charitable causes. 

In 2010, the Benioffs donated $100 million to UCSF Children's Hospital.[33] In 2014, they donated an additional $100 million to the hospital and $50 million to fund research on premature birth.[33] In 2019, the Benioffs donated $25 million to UCSF to create the UCSF Benioff Center for Microbiome Medicine; $10 million to Stanford for the Microbiome Therapies Initiative; and $35 million to establish a Prostate Cancer Research Initiative at UCSF.

In 2016, Benioff announced a $10 million donation to the University of California - Santa Barbara to establish the Benioff Ocean Initiative.

In 2017, the Benioffs partnered with the US National Fish and Wildlife Foundation and the National Oceanic and Atmospheric Administration to form the Pacific Islands Research and Conservation Programme.

In 2019, the Benioffs donated $30 million to the Center for Vulnerable Populations for the Benioff Homelessness and Housing Initiative to study the impacts of homelessness, housing, and health.

In January 2020, Benioff announced that he and his wife would provide financial backing for 1t.org to support a global initiative to plant and conserve 1 trillion trees over the next decade.

In March 2020, Benioff procured 50 million pieces of personal protective equipment for hospitals and COVID-19 first responders in the United States. In April 2020, Benioff donated more than $1 million to Give2SF COVID-19 Response and Recovery Fund. In April 2021, Benioff and Salesforce sent a plane filled with medical supplies to India to help the country handle the COVID-19 pandemic.

In October 2020, Marc and Lynne Benioff were founding partners of Prince William's Earthshot Prize, a program for finding solutions to environmental issues. In October 2021, Benioff pledged a $200 million donation to plant trees and fund ecologically-focused entrepreneurs. Salesforce also donated $100 million to the same causes.

In 2021, they were founding members of the World Economic Forum's Friends of Ocean Action initiative, providing approximately $11 million in funding.

Marc and Lynne Benioff have been included in lists of top givers by Forbes and the Chronicle of Philanthropy.The Chronicle of Philanthropy: "Bequests Put Conservative Billionaire Richard Scaife Atop List of America's 50 Biggest Donors" By Maria Di Mento and Drew Lindsay February 9, 2016

 Social activism 
In March 2015, Benioff announced Salesforce would cancel all employee programs and travel in the state of Indiana after the passing of the Religious Freedom Restoration Act, a bill that would allow companies and individuals to choose not to serve LGBT individuals based on religious beliefs. Benioff led an effort of business leaders fighting back against the legislation, leading to a revised version of the bill being signed into law that prohibited businesses from denying services to someone based on sexual orientation or gender identity.

In April 2015, Benioff announced that he would review salaries at Salesforce to ensure men and women were paid equally.

In February 2016, Benioff announced that Salesforce would reduce investments in Georgia and cancel a conference if HB 757, a bill that would allow businesses to decline services to same-sex couples, was passed. The governor vetoed the bill.

In an October 2018 interview with The Guardian'', Benioff criticized other technology industry executives for "hoarding" their money and refusing to help the homeless in the San Francisco Bay Area. In November, Benioff announced his support for San Francisco's Prop C measure that would increase taxes on large corporations to aid unhoused residents in the city.

In September 2021, Benioff announced that Salesforce would relocate any Texas employees who wanted to move after an abortion law went into effect.

References

Further reading

External links

 Official company biography

1964 births
Living people
Salesforce
20th-century American businesspeople
21st-century American businesspeople
American billionaires
American computer programmers
American Internet company founders
American software engineers
American technology chief executives
American technology writers
Apple Inc. employees
Businesspeople from San Francisco
Jewish American philanthropists
American LGBT rights activists
Oracle employees
People from Burlingame, California
Marshall School of Business alumni
Writers from San Francisco
Giving Pledgers
21st-century American philanthropists